The Kentucky Theater was a theater and performing arts center at 651 S. 4th St., located in the theater district of downtown Louisville, Kentucky in the United States of America.

Built in 1921, the building served for sixty years as a movie house.  The movie house closed in 1986, and was almost scheduled for demolition until a local entrepreneur bought it at auction and  turned it over to two arts advocates who created a non-profit arts organization, called the Kentucky Theater Project, Inc.  The newly renovated Kentucky Theater opened its doors in 2000 and is now a vibrant community arts center and art film house. In 2008, the Kentucky Theater was renovated into the Kentucky Theater Shops. It now includes a gourmet food shop, a wine and spirits shop, a bagel shop and a florist shop.

See also 
 List of attractions and events in the Louisville metropolitan area
 Theater in Kentucky

References

External links 
 
 Gourmet market planned for revamped Kentucky Theater

Cinemas and movie theaters in Kentucky
Arts venues in Louisville, Kentucky
Theatres in Kentucky
Theatres completed in 1921
1921 establishments in Kentucky